Sheikh Hashem Abd al-Rahman, also known as Hashem Abdul Rahman, was mayor of Umm al-Fahm, an Israeli Arab city in the Wadi Ara region of Israel.

A member of the Islamic Movement party in Israel, al-Rahman served as deputy mayor between 1989 and 1998.

Sources
New image for Umm al-Fahm Haaretz

Year of birth missing (living people)
Living people
Arab politicians in Israel
Deputy mayors of places in Israel
Hebron University alumni
Islamic Movement in Israel politicians
Israeli Muslims
Mayors of places in Israel
People from Umm al-Fahm